Tarand may refer to:

People
Andres Tarand (born 1940), Estonian politician
Helmut Tarand (1911–1987), Estonian poet, philiogist and cultural figure
Indrek Tarand (born 1964), Estonian politician
Kaarel Tarand (born 1966), Estonian journalist

Places
Tarand-e Bala, village in Tehran Province, Iran
Tarand-e Pain, village in Tehran Province, Iran
Tarand Rural District, administrative subdivision of Tehran Province, Iran

Other
Tarand (animal), a legendary creature first mentioned by Pliny the Elder

Estonian-language surnames